Mary Elizabeth Zaragoza Guerrini (born 7 December 1968) is a Salvadoran long-distance runner. She competed in the women's 5000 metres at the 2004 Summer Olympics.

References

External links
 

1968 births
Living people
Athletes (track and field) at the 2004 Summer Olympics
Salvadoran female long-distance runners
Olympic athletes of El Salvador
Track and field athletes from San Francisco
Central American Games gold medalists for El Salvador
Central American Games medalists in athletics
Central American Games silver medalists for El Salvador